Below is a list of presidents of the National Assembly of Dahomey:

Below is a list of presidents of the Permanent Committee of National Revolutionary Assembly of Benin:

Below is a list of presidents of the National Assembly of Benin:

Sources

Politics of Benin
Lists of Beninese people
1959 establishments in the Republic of Dahomey
 
Benin politics-related lists